Henry Naunton Davies (1827-1899), was a Welsh physician, best known for his rescue efforts during the 1877 Tynewydd Colliery disaster. He was the first to receive the BMA Gold Medal.

References

1827 births
1899 deaths
Welsh justices of the peace
19th-century Welsh medical doctors